Selling England by the Pound is the fifth studio album by the English progressive rock band Genesis, released in September 1973 on Charisma Records. A single from the album, "I Know What I Like (In Your Wardrobe)", was released in February 1974 and became the band's first top 30 hit in the UK.

The album was recorded in August 1973 following the tour supporting the previous album, Foxtrot (1972). The group set aside a short period of time to write new material, which covered a number of themes, including the loss of English folk culture and an increased American influence, which was reflected in the title. Following the album's release, the group set out on tour, where they drew an enthusiastic reception from fans.

Critics and the band members themselves have given mixed opinions of the album, though guitarist Steve Hackett has said it is his favourite Genesis record. Its reputation has improved over time, appearing on various critical and fan-voted rankings of the best progressive rock albums. The album has continued to sell and has reached Gold certification by the British Phonographic Industry and the Recording Industry Association of America. It was remastered for CD in 1994 and 2007. Several of the album tracks became fan favourites and featured as a regular part of the band's live setlist into the 1980s.

Background 
In May 1973, the Genesis line-up of frontman and singer Peter Gabriel, keyboardist Tony Banks, bassist and guitarist Mike Rutherford, guitarist Steve Hackett and drummer Phil Collins completed their 1972–1973 tour supporting their previous album Foxtrot (1972). The tour marked the band's first full-scale North American tour, which drew positive responses, but journalists were still criticising the band and comparing them to other progressive rock bands of the time such as Emerson, Lake & Palmer, Jethro Tull, and Pink Floyd. Charisma pushed to release new Genesis material to capitalise on the band's newfound commercial success despite the band's wishes against it, and released a compilation of live recordings from early 1973, originally intended for broadcast on the King Biscuit Flower Hour radio show in the US, as their first live album Genesis Live (1973). This budget-priced release also compensated for the cancellation of a proposed gig at Wembley Arena in May 1973, which was cancelled due to the inability to print tickets in time, and to act as a bridging album in between Foxtrot and the next studio album. It became their highest charting album in the UK, peaking at No 9.

The group were too busy touring to write new material, so after coming off the road they set aside time to create new songs. Due to the success of Foxtrot, the group's record label, Charisma Records, allowed them two to three months to come up with a new studio album, which Rutherford considered to be "the kiss of death". Early into the sessions Collins formed a pick-up band with former Yes guitarist Peter Banks for a few gigs, and Rutherford revealed in an interview to Sounds in 1976 that "there had been worries that Phil might want to leave the group". Despite this, Gabriel recalled this time as a "relatively happy and calm period".

Writing and recording 
The album was not written in a single session or location, and Banks recalled the group had some difficulty in coming up with musical ideas. The extra time that Charisma allowed caused the band to adopt a more relaxed pace of working at first, which included periods of unproductive work, such as the constant reworking of ideas to the point where they no longer worked or those that led them back to where they started. The first sessions took place in what reporter Jerry Gilbert described as "a rambling old stately home" in Chessington, Kingston upon Thames, the group practising in the living room causing the neighbours to complain about the noise and impose a curfew. Collins did not remember the album being particularly difficult to put together, but said the Chessington sessions was where the basis of "The Cinema Show" was put together. He had been listening to the jazz fusion group Mahavishnu Orchestra which influenced him to play more complicated time signatures on the drums for "Dancing With the Moonlit Knight" and other parts on the album. Rehearsals then moved to London in a space beneath the Una Billings School of Dance in Shepherd's Bush, during which "I Know What I Like (In Your Wardrobe)" was developed further. Hackett had not contributed a great deal of material to the group at this point, which was made difficult by the breakdown of his first marriage going on around the same time. Rather than pitch whole songs he instead devised guitar licks, all of which were used, and believed it gave the album a jazz fusion feel yet still remained very English.

Two sections that were brought into the sessions from the start were a simple guitar riff that Hackett had been playing that the band liked and wanted to develop further and became "I Know What I Like (In Your Wardrobe)", and three bits from Banks that he initially thought were for different songs but were instead used in the final arrangement of "Firth of Fifth". The third section developed early on became the opening of "The Battle of Epping Forest", and the band repeatedly performed these three pieces daily for a short while which Banks thought resulted in the latter song being too overworked. Despite the setbacks, biographer Robin Platts wrote: "There were enough magic moments and inspired jam sessions to produce such enduring compositions".

One of the ideas that Gabriel wanted to convey with the album was the idea of looking at "Englishness in a different way". This included his suggestion of the album's title, itself a slogan adopted by the Labour Party manifesto, to ensure that the British press would not accuse the band of "selling out" to America. Rutherford later deemed the title to be among the band's best album titles. Overall, it represented a decay of English folk culture and an increase in Americanisation. Banks said the English theme across the album was not an intentional idea at first, but merely the way the songs naturally developed. Gabriel later said he wrote all his lyrical contributions to the album in two days.

Having rehearsed and written enough material for an album, the group entered Island Studios in London in August 1973. As with Foxtrot, John Burns helped with production. Burns' technical skills resulted in a good recorded sound and environment, and this motivated the group to play better and tackle more complex arrangements. Gabriel was conscious of the greater use of lengthy instrumental sections on the album which he thought presented the risk of the material becoming boring.

Songs

Side one

"Dancing with the Moonlit Knight" evolved from a number of short piano pieces composed by Gabriel, which was combined with some of Hackett's guitar figures to make up the track. Gabriel added English-themed lyrics to counter the impression from the music press that Genesis were trying too hard to appeal to the American audience, including references to Green Shield Stamps. Banks had upgraded to a new model of Mellotron and used the choir sound on the track. The track ends with a series of 12-string guitar figures that were originally supposed to segue into "The Cinema Show" to make a piece around 20 minutes in length, but this idea was dropped as the result was too comparable to the 23-minute "Supper's Ready" on Foxtrot. Its original working title was "Disney". Rutherford thought the song's opening provided a good start to the album, but felt less enthusiastic towards it overall, calling it "a bit busy".

"I Know What I Like (In Your Wardrobe)" came out of a jam session by the group around one of Hackett's guitar riffs. He had presented the riff to the group previously, but it had been rejected because it sounded too much like the Beatles. Gilbert described an early listening of the song as "Hints of quaint English romanticism" that, according to Gabriel, was initially intended to have more of a folk-oriented melody. The percussion sounds heard at the beginning are Gabriel playing with a talking drum that Burns had purchased from Nigeria. It was released as a single from the album, which became the first of the group's to chart in the UK.

Banks wrote most of "Firth of Fifth" on his own, and had presented it to the group for Foxtrot, but it was rejected. He reworked some sections of the song for Selling England by the Pound, where it drew a more positive reception. The track opens with a solo piece for piano, that is repeated by the band later in the song. Banks recalled the difficulty to remove the noise created by the piano pedal in the studio, so he played the passage without it which he found difficult. Hackett took one of Banks' piano figures and rearranged it as a guitar solo, which dominates the latter part of the track. Banks later deemed the lyrics, to which he contributed with assistance from Rutherford, as one of the worst he had worked on. He had aimed to follow "the idea of a river and then I got a bit caught up in the cosmos and I don't quite know where I ended up".

"More Fool Me" is the second of two songs, the other being "For Absent Friends" from Nursery Cryme, to feature Collins on lead vocals before he became the band's lead singer in 1975. Uncharacteristically for the group's output at the time, the song was a tender, romantic ballad. It was written quickly by Collins and Rutherford while sitting on the steps outside the recording studio. Gabriel considered the pair's contributions "quite a breakthrough".

Side two
"The Battle of Epping Forest" was inspired by a news story that Gabriel had read several years previously about the territorial battles by two rival gangs in the East End of London that would fight in Epping Forest. He placed an advertisement in The Times and looked through library archives in attempt to find more about the story, but was unable to find any further information, so he created his own fictional characters, including "Liquid Len", "Harold Demure" and "The Bethnal Green Butcher". Upon hearing a rehearsal take of the song in July 1973, reporter Chris Welch wrote: "'The 'Battle' has a catchy march theme with typical Genesis drum and bass lines, clean and precise". The lyrics have since been praised for their humour and wit, but the band later said they did not gel well with the music and made the piece complicated for the sake of being so. Gabriel thought its ending, which had each gang settling the issue over the toss of a coin, tied up the story well but is too much of an anti-climax.

"After the Ordeal" is an instrumental written by Hackett (with the assistance of Rutherford); the song originated as more of an electric piece but neither he nor the other band members could adapt it into something that they felt worked, so it was transformed with an acoustic introduction with an electric guitar solo to finish. Hackett mentioned in a homemade video capsule that this was the first Genesis track on which he ever used a nylon guitar. Banks and Gabriel did not want to include the song on the album, but Hackett insisted it should be kept; Banks expressed little interest in its "pseudo classical" style. It was ultimately left on after Gabriel and Banks argued about the length of "The Cinema Show", which meant everything was included as a compromise. Banks later said the compromise led to the album overrunning its desirable length on vinyl, resulting in a sound quality he thought came out as "pretty rough".

"The Cinema Show" is divided into two sections. The first section is a 12-string guitar-based piece, featuring vocal harmonies between Gabriel and Collins, as well as a short flute and oboe solo. The song concludes with a four-and-a-half-minute keyboard solo on the ARP Pro Soloist, with Rutherford and Collins playing a rhythm in a  time signature. The lyrics, written by Banks and Rutherford, draw much of their inspiration from the T. S. Eliot poem The Waste Land.

The album closes with a segue from the end of "The Cinema Show" into "Aisle of Plenty", a reprise of "Dancing with the Moonlit Knight" which gives the album a book-end effect. The track uses word play such as "Easy, love there's the safe way home" and "Thankful for her fine fair discount, Tess co-operates", referring to British supermarkets.

Additional material
During the album's sessions Gabriel and Hackett developed a track named "Déja Vu", but it remained unfinished and left off the album. Hackett prepared a finished version of the song for his album Genesis Revisited (1996). He performed the song live on his 2019 tour which featured Selling England by the Pound performed in its entirety.

Sleeve design 
The album cover is a painting by Betty Swanwick titled The Dream. Swanwick had designed posters for London Transport between the 1930s and 1950s. The original painting did not include a lawn mower; the band had Swanwick add it later as an allusion to the track "I Know What I Like" because Swanwick told them she did not have enough time to paint a new picture for the cover.

Release 
Selling England by the Pound was released in late September 1973, reaching No. 3 in the UK charts and No. 70 on the U.S. Billboard Pop Albums chart. The album's success in the U.S. benefitted from a switch from Buddah Records to Atlantic. "I Know What I Like (In Your Wardrobe)" was released as a single, with "Twilight Alehouse" on the B-side, in February 1974. It was the band's first single to enter the UK chart, and peaked at No. 21. It was successful enough for Genesis to be invited to perform the song on the British television show Top of the Pops, which the band declined. In 2013, the album was certified Gold by the British Phonographic Industry for selling 100,000 copies.

The album was digitally remastered for compact disc in 1994 and again in 2007 by Rhino Records.

Critical reception and legacy 

Contemporary reviews for the album were mixed. Rolling Stones Paul Gambaccini praised the band for attempting something utterly different amidst "a stagnant pop scene", but criticised the album's lyrics, feeling they overused British pop culture references, and complained about some musical passages. Despite this, Gambaccini thought the album "merits some recognition". NMEs Barbara Charone said the album was "the band's best, most adventurous album to date". The Guardians Robin Denselow wrote that "much of the material is indistinctive and tedious". Writing for The Village Voice in June 1974, Robert Christgau assessed the record as "down-to-earth progressive, which means that it indulges in snooty satire about the vulgar futility of working class youth. Would T.S. Eliot be proud? I doubt it. But I have the feeling that they're saying right out what all their co-workers in the genre are thinking, and there's some pretty dense music here."

Retrospective reviews have been more favourable. AllMusic and BBC Music remarked that the album returned to the whimsical eccentricity of Nursery Cryme while retaining the hard rock intensity and pessimism of Foxtrot, combining the best of both elements to make Genesis's best album up to that point. Christgau, later writing in Christgau's Record Guide: Rock Albums of the Seventies (1981), admitted that the songs "Firth of Fifth" and "The Battle of Epping Forest" have "a complexity of tone that's pretty rare in any kind of art", though he summarised the rest of the album by saying "it sounds as snooty as usual".

In 2012, the album ranked seventh in Rolling Stones "Readers' Poll: Your Favorite Prog Rock Albums of All Time". It was also included in IGN's list "10 Classic Prog Rock Albums" in 2008, who praised its "subtle elegance, sublime textures, and lyrical splendor". Rock author Edward Macan has mixed feelings towards the album, praising "Firth of Fifth" and "The Cinema Show" but questioning some of the other material. Motoring journalist and broadcaster Jeremy Clarkson is a fan of the album and wrote sleeve notes for it when it was included in the box set Genesis 1970–1975.

Hackett has considered the album to be his favourite Genesis record, and was happy with his extensive contributions to it. In 2017, he explained, "It was an important watershed album for the band, and it was at the beginning of us struggling to find gigs in the States. If we could get into a club somewhere, wherever it was, that was good news for us at that time. A young, struggling band, but with an album that was due to become a classic in time." Banks and Rutherford have had mixed feelings, saying there are a lot of high points but also some lows. Charisma owner Tony Stratton-Smith was disappointed with the album, which he thought contained too many instrumental sections. Band friend and former roadie Richard Macphail thought the power of Genesis live had not been captured on record properly until Burns started to work with them and that by the time of Selling England, the group had acquired better equipment.

Selling England by the Pound has been praised by other songwriters and musicians. Rush drummer Neil Peart has said: "I think Selling England by the Pound is an enduring masterpiece of drumming. Beautiful drumming, lovely sound, and the arrangements, I think they really nailed the best of what that band as an entity could have done with that album." Fish, solo artist and former lead singer of Marillion, has called it "the definitive Genesis album", praised its "emotive" quality, said the wordplay was "one of the things that became quite an influence on me – the games within the lyrics" and concluded it "took a whole jump forward and was the album that really got me into Genesis". According to Hackett, John Lennon said he liked the album during a radio interview, which the band took great encouragement from. Swedish guitarist Yngwie Malmsteen also cites the album as a major influence. In an interview, Robert Pollard of Guided By Voices said "Selling England By The Pound is one of my top 10 records of all time" and that "Genesis with Peter Gabriel might be my biggest influence."

 Tour 

Genesis supported the album with a concert tour of Europe and North America from September 1973 to May 1974. Initially they were to perform with a new and more elaborate stage set than before, that included inflatable objects that had images projected onto them, but a change in fire regulations following the Summerland disaster in August 1973 led to the idea being scrapped. Gabriel devised new stories before songs, and wore a full costume with a helmet and shield representing the Britannia character for "Dancing With the Moonlit Knight" and sung "The Battle of Epping Forest" with a stocking over his head.

The tour began with a sold-out tour of the UK, but had to cancel the first date at the Green's Playhouse, Glasgow due to electrical safety issues minutes before its start. The group realised they were substantially in debt and needed better management, so recruited Tony Smith (no relation to Charisma boss Tony Stratton-Smith). In October 1973 a pair of dates in the tour were filmed by Charisma for a possible cinema release, but the plan was rejected by the band who felt the film was not up to standard. Instead, the band performed a five-song set in front of an invited audience at Shepperton Studios that was filmed and broadcast as Tony Stratton-Smith Presents Genesis in Concert. The group returned to the U.S. in December 1973 that included six shows in three nights at The Roxy in Los Angeles, and a performance of "Watcher of the Skies" and "The Musical Box" on the late night television show The Midnight Special. January 1974 saw the band perform five nights at Theatre Royal, Drury Lane which saw Gabriel lifted in the air by a wire during "Supper's Ready".

 Track listing 
All tracks credited to Tony Banks, Phil Collins, Peter Gabriel, Steve Hackett and Mike Rutherford. Actual songwriters listed below. All tracks produced by Genesis and John Burns.

 Personnel 
Adapted from the album's 1973 sleeve notes.Genesis Peter Gabriel – vocals, flute, oboe, percussion
 Tony Banks – Hammond organ, Mellotron, Hohner Pianet, ARP Pro Soloist, piano, 12-string guitar
 Steve Hackett – electric guitar, nylon guitar
 Mike Rutherford – 12-string guitar, bass, electric sitar, cello
 Phil Collins – drums, assorted percussion, lead vocals on "More Fool Me", backing vocalsProduction John Burns – producer, engineer
 Genesis – production
 Rhett Davies – assistant engineer
 Betty Swanwick – cover painting

Charts

 Certifications 

 References NotesCitationsBibliography 
 
 
 
 
 
 
 
 
 DVD Media'

External links 
 Analysis of "Dancing with the Moonlit Knight" lyrics by George Starosin

1973 albums
Albums produced by Mike Rutherford
Albums produced by Peter Gabriel
Albums produced by Phil Collins
Albums produced by Tony Banks (musician)
Atlantic Records albums
Charisma Records albums
Genesis (band) albums
Progressive rock albums by English artists